Cesarino Pestuggia (born 11 September 1934) is an Italian rower. He competed in the men's double sculls event at the 1960 Summer Olympics.

References

External links
 

1934 births
Living people
Italian male rowers
Olympic rowers of Italy
Rowers at the 1960 Summer Olympics
Sportspeople from the Province of Como